Agnihotra (IAST: Agnihotra, Devnagari: अग्निहोत्र) refers to the yajna of offering ghee into the sacred fire as per strict rites, and may include twice-daily heated milk offering made by those in the Śrauta tradition. The ritual has been described by P.E. Dumont as a "fertility charm", and as a "solar charm" which symbolically preserved and created the sun at nightfall and sunrise.

This tradition dates back to the Vedic age; the Brahmans perform the Agnihotra ritual chanting the verses from the Rigveda. It is part of a pan-Indo-Iranian heritage, which includes the related Iranian fire-worship ritual called Zoroastrian Yasna Haptaŋhāiti ritual mentioned in the Old Avestan. In the historical Vedic religion, Agnihotra was the simplest public rite, and the head of every Brahmin and Vaishya family was required to conduct it twice daily. It was already popular in India with Upaniṣads as religious performance. The tradition is now practiced in many parts of South Asia in the Indian sub-continent, including primarily India and also in Nepal. The Brahmin who performs the Agnihotra ritual is called an Agnihotri.

Vedic Agnihotra

Preliminaries

The ritual is conducted twice daily, right before or after sunrise and after sunset or the appearance of the first night star. The morning and evening agnihotras differ by the mantras and chants made by the officiants. At least four people take part in the sacrifice: the sacrificer, who hires priests to perform the ceremony (Brahmin), his wife, an Adhvaryu and a milker.

Vedic rituals are typically performed by four priests: the aforementioned adhvaryu, who is responsible for the physical details of the sacrifice and chants the Yajurveda, a hotṛi who recites the Rigveda, an udgātṛi who sings hymns of the Samaveda, and a brahman who supervises the ceremony, and recites the Atharvaveda while correcting any errors that may occur. There are three fires: an eastern offertorial fire called an āhavanīya lit in a square fire pit, a western fire called the gārhapatya lit in a circular fire pit, which represents the householder's fire, and a southern fire simply called the dakṣiṇāgni (Southern fire). During the ceremonies, a poker, a pot called an agnihotrasthālī, a spoon known as a sruva, and a larger ladle called the agnihotrahavani are all used. At the centre of the ritual space is an earthen altar called the vedi where the tools to perform the ritual are placed.

Ritual

When the sacrificial area has been cleaned and the sacrificial fire lit, a cow is brought to the grounds and the milker, an ā́rya and not a śūdra, recites mantras before it, then brings the calf to the right side of its mother before beginning the milking. The milk is kept in the agnihotrasthālī, which can also only be made by an ā́rya. When the milking is complete, the adhvaryu pours water around the three fires, before boiling the collected milk on coals collected from the gārhapatya. The adhvaryu draws milk from the agnihotrasthālī to the agnihotrahavani, pouring it onto sacrificial sticks twice: first when reciting mantras, and the second silently. He then ritually consumes some of the milk before placing the sticks into the āhavanīya. When the libations are complete, the agnihotrahavani is cleaned with Darbha grass and refilled with water. It is then heated on the āhavanīya as additional mantras are recited, and poured onto the vedi as an additional libation. In certain versions of the ritual (but not that contained in the Tattirīya Brahmana), this is followed by a blade of grass being offered to the āhavanīya. When the ceremony is complete, the adhvaryu sips some of the leftover water, recites the mantra "From Rta I have found Satya" and pours water on his head.

Ithihasa
The Brāhmaṇas explains the origin of agnihotra. In one, Prajapati, after creating Agni, offers the sweat of his brow (which became ghee) or his eye after hearing his voice commanding himself to sacrifice, creating Surya. The origin of the exclamation svāhā, said as offerings are made into the sacrificial fire, is explained as a combination of svā (own) and āha (spoken). In another, the agnihotra is a condensed version of a thousand-year sacrifice Prajapati and the other devas performed to gain divine power.

Agnihotra rituals in Nepal

Witzel (1992) locates the first Agnishala hypothetically at Jhul (Mātātīrtha), in the western ridge of the Kathmandu valley and later at the southern rim of the palace of Aṃśuvermā at Hadigaon, Kathmandu. The first source of inscription evidence was from Tachapal tole, east part of Bhaktapur city, also shown by a legend that the Maithila King Harisiṃhadeva would establish the yantra of Taleju Bhavānī in the house of an Agnihotri. From 1600 CE onward, the Agnihotra has been attested to the Agnishala temple in Patan only.

The Agnihotra ritual in Nepal has been first recorded in an inscription of King Anandadeva in c. 1140 CE that mentions of the initiations of his two sons, viz. Yasho Malla and prince Somesvara at Agnimatha (or Agnishala in Lalitpur). The temple of Agnishala since the 12th century maintains the Vedic tradition of Agnihotra fire sacrifice ritual and despite having undergone many ritual changes,  the basic Vedic performance is still intact. The Agnishala is maintained by the Newar Rajopadhyaya Brahmins of Patan, who are the premier Krishna Yajurvedic Brahmins of Nepal.

Along with these, there are other Agnishalas identified and recently revived, viz.
at southern edge of Pashupatinath temple (a UNESCO World Heritage Site of Nepal) by a Purbe Brahmin. This has been in practice for almost 200 years now, and for this Agnishala, in 1974 the government provided NRs. 18,000 (then around US $7,000) per year.
at Kumarigal, south of Bouddha (another UNESCO World Heritage Site in Nepal) in Kathmandu by Narayan Prasad, a Purbe Brahmin
at Thamel, north of central Kathmandu by Tirtha Raj Acharya

Agnihotra and Gajanan Maharaj

A simplified variant of the agnihotra ceremony was popularized in the mid-1900s by Gajanan Maharaj, and entails the offering of ghee and brown rice into only a single fire lit in a copper pyramid-shaped brazier with cow dung and additional amounts of ghee. Mantras are repeated during this process. Practitioners claim a number of physical and environmental benefits from performing the ritual; however, these are pseudoscientific. In 2007, Sylvia Kratz and Ewald Schaung found that while Agnihotra ash possibly increased the amount of phosphorus in soil, levels were the same regardless of whether the ceremony was done at the prescribed times with mantras or not. The composition of the pyramid was found to be a factor, with ash created in iron pyramids containing significantly less phosphorus than ones made of copper.

Mantras
Like the Vedic Agnihotra, the modern version of Agnihotra perpetuated by Gajanan Maharaj and groups such as Homa Therapy has two variants, one for the evening and one for the morning. At sunset, the practitioner says "Agnaye svāhā idam Agnaye na mama" (Devanagari: अग्नये स्वाहा इदम् अग्नये न मम), offering the first half of the rice or ghee into the fire after "svāhā" is spoken. After the first mantra is said, the practitioner then says, "Prajāpataye svāhā Prajāpataye idam na mama" (Devanagari: प्रजापतये स्वाहा प्रजापतये इदम् न मम), again offering a second portion of rice and/or ghee as soon as "svāhā" is spoken. The morning Agnihotra is identical, save for the fact that Surya is substituted for Agni.

See also
Agni
Homa
Agnicayana
Fire Sermon
Yajna
Dhyāna in Hinduism#Agnihotra
Pranagnihotra Upanishad

External links
 Modern performance of the Vedic agnihotra

Notes

References

Yajna
Religion in Nepal
Vedic customs
Religious rituals
Traditions involving fire
Hindu practices